The Philippine Board of Nursing is an administrative body under the Professional Regulation Commission that regulates the practice of nursing in the Philippines.

Its three primary purposes are:

 To provide regulatory standards in the practice of Nursing by implementing the Nurse Practice Act and by lobbying to Congress any proposed amendment to any laws with direct relationship to the practice of nursing.
 To ensure public safety by administering the Philippine Nursing Licensure Exam (PNLE) to graduates of nursing schools prior to practice of Registered Nursing in the Philippines.
 To maintain high standards of nursing education by auditing the performance of Philippine Nursing Schools.

Nursing organizations in the Philippines
Quasi-judicial bodies
Government agencies of the Philippines
Department of Labor and Employment (Philippines)
Nursing licensing organizations